John Nyren (15 December 1764 – 30 June 1837) was an English cricketer and author.  Nyren made 16 known appearances in first-class cricket from 1787 to 1817.  He achieved lasting fame as the author of The Cricketers of My Time, which was first published in 1832 as a serial in a periodical called The Town and was then included in The Young Cricketer's Tutor, published in 1833 by Effingham Wilson of London.  Nyren's collaborator in the work was Charles Cowden Clarke.

Family and background
Nyren was the son of Richard Nyren, the captain of the Hambledon Club in its "glory days". He was brought up in the Bat and Ball Inn, where his father was the landlord, immediately opposite Broadhalfpenny Down, about a mile from Hambledon village where he was born.

Cricket career
Nyren, who was a left-handed batsman and left-handed fieldsman, played for the Hambledon Club from 1778 until 1791. He was described as "standing nearly 6 ft, of large proportions throughout, big-boned, strong and active". He is first recorded in first-class cricket in 1787, around the time his father retired from the game, and he played occasionally until 1817. He played for the Gentlemen in the inaugural and second Gentlemen v Players matches in 1806. Although he was a fine fieldsman, his playing career was not distinguished and he would now be remembered only as the son of a famous father if he had not turned his hand to literature in his old age.

Writing career
In 1832, Nyren was living in London when he began his collaboration with Cowden Clarke, who recorded Nyren's reminiscences of the Hambledon era and published them serially in The Town as The Cricketers of My Time.  The following year, the series with some modifications appeared as part of an instructional book entitled The Young Cricketer's Tutor. It became a major source for the history and personalities of Georgian cricket and also came to be regarded as the first classic in cricket's now rich literary history.

Personal life
As well as being a devotee of cricket, Nyren was a talented musician who played the violin and composed music. Some of his compositions were published by Vincent Novello, who was a close friend. For 13 years Nyren was the choir master at St Mary's, Moorfields, where Novello was the organist.

Nyren married Cleopha Copp, aged 17, in 1791. They had two sons and five daughters, as well as two children who died in infancy. They lived first in Portsea, then in 1796 they moved to Bromley in Kent, and later lived in Battersea, London, then Cheyne Walk, Chelsea, and finally moved back to Bromley to live in Bromley Palace, where Nyren died.

References

Bibliography
 H S Altham, A History of Cricket, Volume 1 (to 1914), George Allen & Unwin, 1962
 Ashley Mote: The Glory Days of Cricket, Robson, 1997
 John Nyren, The Cricketers of my Time (ed. Ashley Mote), Robson, 1998

External links
 
 The Hambledon Men, including Nyren's The Young Cricketer's Tutor and The Cricketers of My Time, digitised at Internet Archive

English cricketers
English cricketers of 1701 to 1786
English cricketers of 1787 to 1825
Gentlemen cricketers
Hampshire cricketers
1764 births
1837 deaths
People from Hambledon, Hampshire
Cricket historians and writers
Hambledon cricketers
Kent cricketers
Homerton Cricket Club cricketers
Lord Frederick Beauclerk's XI cricketers
Marylebone Cricket Club and Homerton cricketers